Tedi Papavrami, (born 13 May 1971) is an Albanian professional violinist.

Biography 
Papavrami was born in Tirana in 1971 and started to play the violin at the age of four. He studied violin with his father, well known Prof. Robert Papavrami, which impacted heavily on the artistic future of his son. At age 8 he interpreted Sarasate's "Arie Bohemienne" with the Philharmonic Orchestra of Tirana, and three years later Paganini's first violin concerto.

In September 1982, thanks to flautist Alain Marion, the French government offered him a scholarship to study at the Conservatoire de Paris under the direction of Pierre Amoyal. In 1985 he won the "International Rodolfo Lipizer Violin Competition" in Gorizia and in 1986 he won with unanimity the "First Award" of the Conservatory of Paris. In 1987 he received a degree at the Lausanne Conservatory.

Papavrami then continued his musical studies under the direction of Zino Francescatti and Viktoria Mullova. In 1992 he won the prize awarded by Sacem "George Enescu" and in 1993, the first prize and special prize in the "International Competition Sarasate" in Pamplona.

In addition to his international career as a violinist, Papavrami has appeared in Les Liaisons dangereuses, the 2003 French film made for television, playing Raphael Danceny, the music tutor to Cécile de Volanges (Leelee Sobieski). He has also become the French translator of Ismail Kadaré's literary works since the death in 2002 of Jusuf Vrioni.

Tedi Papavrami has played in Europe, South Africa, Turkey, Japan, Israel, with the Orchestra of Bologna, Bamberger Symphoniker, Orchestre de Paris, etc.. He has been guided by known orchestra directors such as K.Sanderling, C.Hogwood, A.Pappano, L.Langree, G.Varga, Z.Macal and Jean-Claude Casadesus.

In the 2000-2001 season he has performed with the Orchestre de Nice, the Orquesta Sinfonica de Galicia, the Orchestre Philharmonique de Liege, etc., and has conducted several tours in Japan with "24 capricci" of Paganini. Tedi Papavrami regularly plays chamber music with P.Bianconi, H.Sermet, M.Rubackyte, P.Meyer, E.Lesage, R.Oleg and G.Hoffman.

He has interpreted the film Provincial Chronicle (2009)

Discography 
Franck & Faure, Sonates pour violin et piano (with Nelson Goerner) 2016
Prokofiev, Violin Concertos Nos. 1 Tnd 2, Sonata for solo violin with Polish National Radio Symphony Orchestra, Antoni Wit, Naxos, 
Paganini 24 caprices (1997 recorded Theatre des Quatres saisons a Gragignan) CD-(no label name mentioned)
Ysaye's six complete sonatas for violin

External links 
 Official website of Tedi Papavrami 

1971 births
Living people
Albanian musicians
Albanian violinists
Musicians from Tirana
Conservatoire de Paris alumni
21st-century violinists